Christian Reich (born 23 September 1967 in Aarau) is a Swiss bobsledder who competed from the late 1990s to the early 2000s. Competing in four Winter Olympics, he won a silver medal in the two-man event with teammate Steve Anderhub at Salt Lake City in 2002.

Reich also won four medals at the FIBT World Championships with one silver (Four-man: 1989) and three bronzes (Two-man: 2000, Four-man: 2000, 2001).

He won the two-man Bobsleigh World Cup championship in 1999-2000

References
1992 bobsleigh two-man results
1992 bobsleigh four-man results
1994 bobsleigh four-man results
1998 bobsleigh two-man results
1998 bobsleigh four-man results
Bobsleigh two-man Olympic medalists 1932-56 and since 1964
Bobsleigh two-man world championship medalists since 1931
Bobsleigh four-man world championship medalists since 1930
DatabaseOlympics.com profile
List of combined men's bobsleigh World Cup champions: 1985-2007
List of four-man bobsleigh World Cup champions since 1985
List of two-man bobsleigh World Cup champions since 1985

1967 births
Living people
Swiss male bobsledders
Bobsledders at the 1992 Winter Olympics
Bobsledders at the 1994 Winter Olympics
Bobsledders at the 1998 Winter Olympics
Bobsledders at the 2002 Winter Olympics
Olympic silver medalists for Switzerland
Olympic bobsledders of Switzerland
Olympic medalists in bobsleigh
Medalists at the 2002 Winter Olympics
People from Aarau
Sportspeople from Aargau